Al-Khalidiyah (also spelled Khaldiyeh) is a village in northwestern Syria, administratively part of the Hama Governorate, south of Hama. Nearby localities include Kafr Buhum to the southwest, Ayyubiyah to the south, Maarin al-Jabal to the southeast, al-Jinan to the east and Surayhin to the northeast. According to the Central Bureau of Statistics, al-Khalidiyah had a population of 4,740 in the 2004 census. Its inhabitants are predominantly Sunni Muslims.

References

Bibliography

 

Populated places in Hama District